Cuckoo on a Choo Choo is a 1952 short subject directed by Jules White starring American slapstick comedy team The Three Stooges (Moe Howard, Larry Fine and Shemp Howard). It is the 143rd entry in the series released by Columbia Pictures starring the comedians, who released 190 shorts for the studio between 1934 and 1959.

Plot
Larry and Shemp are hiding out in a stolen railroad car called "Schmow." Larry wants to marry his girlfriend Lenore (Patricia Wright), but she refuses to consent until Shemp marries her sister Roberta (Victoria Horne). Lenore wants to honor her family's tradition of the oldest daughter marrying first, and Shemp is very wealthy. The problem is that Shemp is rarely sober, drinking alcohol, and madly in love with an imaginary giant canary named Carrie.

A private investigator from the railroad (Moe) finds the missing train, and is trying to get a sense of how the car was stolen from a moving train. As fate would have it, Moe had a previous relationship with Roberta, and has not seen her for years. He is ecstatic to find her after many years of disconnect, and tries his best to rekindle the long dormant love affair. Larry tries to pit Moe and Shemp against each other over Roberta, but Shemp still prefers Carrie. Moe then decides to abandon his responsibilities and stay with the group, trying to marry Roberta.  The film ends with Shemp trying to follow Carrie, but bumps into the door, collapsing and knocks himself out unconscious.

Cast
 Moe Howard as Moe & Radio announcer
 Larry Fine as Larry
 Shemp Howard as Shemp
 Patricia Wright as Lenore
 Victoria Horne as Roberta
 Reggie Dvorak as Carrie the canary

Reception
Cuckoo on a Choo Choo has been dubbed one of the most original and unique shorts in the Stooge canon. However, fans and critics alike generally regard it as the worst Stooge comedy made.

Production notes
Cuckoo on a Choo Choo was filmed on April 21–23, 1952. The plot is borrowed from two popular films of the period. The idea of a stolen railroad car is a parody of A Streetcar Named Desire, while the imaginary animal friend parodies the film Harvey (Victoria Horne had starred in the latter). The theme of a woman's unwillingness to marry until her sister can be found in a willing husband-to-be alludes to Kiss Me, Kate, a Cole Porter musical based on the Bard's play, which also had a 1953 MGM film adaptation.

This reportedly was one of Larry Fine's favorite shorts to watch repeatedly during his last years in the Motion Picture House. It is one of the only Stooge shorts in which he plays a different character than usual:  tougher, more domineering, and speaking in a gravelly, mumbly voice in a broad parody of Marlon Brando as Stanley Kowalski in A Streetcar Named Desire.

Over the course of their 24 years at Columbia Pictures, the Stooges would occasionally be cast as separate characters. This course of action always worked against the team; author Jon Solomon concluded "when the writing divides them, they lose their comic dynamic." In addition to this split occurring in Cuckoo on a Choo Choo, the trio also played separate characters in Rockin' in the Rockies (their only starring feature film with Curly Howard and possibly designed to fail so that Columbia could continue with the shorts instead of promoting them to full-length films), He Cooked His Goose (and its remake Triple Crossed), Gypped in the Penthouse, Flying Saucer Daffy and Sweet and Hot.

References

External links 
 
 
 Cuckoo on a Choo Choo at threestooges.net

1952 films
The Three Stooges films
Columbia Pictures short films
1950s English-language films
American black-and-white films
Films directed by Jules White
Fiction about rail transport
1952 comedy films
1952 short films
American comedy short films
1950s American films